ECPod.com was a Chinese-language social network, created in 2007 by a group of young entrepreneurs in Hong Kong. ECPod was also a community portal for people to share videos.

History 
ECPod was first launched in June 2007 as a language learning website. ECPod stood for "English Chinese Podcast", where members could post home videos of themselves teaching English and Chinese.

Growth 
At the early stage, ECPod was paying a rate of US$1.20 or RMB10 per video clip for members to upload their videos. The response was overwhelming and after just 2 months, ECPod had to stop paying for videos due to budget constraints. However, membership swelled to 5,000 by August 2007 and members continued to upload home-made videos for no pay as the community grew.

By December 2007, membership stood at 20,000 and members started to experience a slowdown in server response time when using the website. This was due to lack of bandwidth for users outside of Hong Kong. The founders of ECPod started to look for potential investors in early 2008 and managed to attract private angel investors in Hong Kong. ECPod received its first investment of US$150,000 in March 2008.

Updates 
From April 2008 to May 2008, ECPod ran a member survey to gauge interest in features needed to redevelop the website beyond a language learning portal. With the survey results and the investment money, ECPod contracted a team of 5 developers and designers from VHost Network to start the development of ECPod phase II.

The beta version of the new, phase II ECPod site was released on 16 October 2008.

Further reading

References

External links 
Official Site

Chinese social networking websites